Randavan (also Romanized as Randavān) is a village in Zefreh Rural District, Kuhpayeh District, Isfahan County, Isfahan Province, Iran. According to the 2006 census, its population consisted of 5 families of 23 people.

References 

Populated places in Isfahan County